Jūlijs Vanags (born , Ungurmuiža Parish (now Jēkabpils District), Russian Empire – died 12 October 1986, Riga, Latvian SSR) was a Soviet and Latvian writer and a co-author of the text of the Anthem of the Latvian SSR.

References

1903 births
1986 deaths
People from Vidzeme

Communist Party of the Soviet Union members
Latvian male writers
Latvian screenwriters
Soviet male writers
Soviet screenwriters
Recipients of the Order of the Red Banner of Labour
Recipients of the Order of the Red Star